Uroplatus ebenaui, commonly known as Ebenau's leaf-tailed gecko, the Nosy Be flat-tail gecko, and the spearpoint leaf-tail gecko, is a species of lizard in the family Gekkonidae. The species is native to Madagascar.

Geographic range

Etymology
The specific name, ebenaui, is in honor of German zoologist Karl Ebenau.

Habitat
U. ebenaui lives in tropical rain forests and dry deciduous forests.

Description

U. ebenaui is the smallest species of Uroplatus and can reach a total length (including tail) of 4 inches.

Behavior
U. ebenaui is arboreal and nocturnal.  This gecko eats insects at night and is inactive during the day.  Additionally, it sleeps flattened against tree trunks, camouflaged with the bark.

Reproduction
U. ebenaui is oviparous. Clutch size is two spherical eggs, which are laid on the ground.

Taxonomy
Uroplatus ebenaui may be a complex of species.

References

External links

Further reading
Angel F (1942). "Les Lézards de Madagascar ". Mem. Acad. Malagache, Tananarive 36: 1–193. (in French).
Boettger O (1879). "Die Reptilien und Amphibien von Madagascar ". Abhandlungen herausgegeben von der senckenbergischen naturforschenden Gesellschaft, Frankfurt 11: 269–283. (Uroplates ebenaui, new species, p. 273 + Plate I, figures 1a-1d). (in German).
Boulenger GA (1885). Catalogue of the Lizards in the British Museum (Natural History). Second Edition. Volume I. Geckonidæ ... London: Trustees of the British Museum (Natural History). (Taylor and Francis, printers). xii + 436 pp. + Plates I-XXXII. (Uroplates ebenaui, p. 238).
Glaw F, Vences M (1994). A Fieldguide to the Amphibians and Reptiles of Madagascar, Second Edition. Cologne, Germany: Vences & Glaw Verlag / Serpents Tale. 480 pp. .

ebenaui
Endemic fauna of Madagascar
Reptiles described in 1879
Taxa named by Oskar Boettger